Stop Violence Against Women is a worldwide campaign of Amnesty International to counter violence against women.

It was started on 5 March 2004, in preparation before International Women's Day. It is one of Amnesty's key campaigns. Amnesty considers that domestic and sexual violence are serious breaches of human rights and Amnesty should confront them. The campaign focuses on ending impunity for those who commit such violence, by pressuring governments to prosecute individuals and change laws to protect women. Amnesty is particularly concerned at the incidence of rape and other violence committed in conflicts such the Second Congo War and Darfur conflict

See also
National Day of Remembrance and Action on Violence Against Women (White Ribbon Campaign)
International Day for the Elimination of Violence against Women
 Declaration on the Elimination of Violence Against Women

External links
Stop Violence Against Women Campaign page

Amnesty International
Violence against women